By-elections to Andipatti constituency was held in Tamil Nadu, India, on 21 February 2002. Three state assembly constituencies, Saidapet, Vaniyambadi, and Acharapakkam were held on 31 May 2002. In 2003, by-election in Sathankulam was held on 26 February 2003. During this by-election, the DMK and all the other major parties supported the Congress candidate, while only BJP supported the AIADMK candidate. This election came after the support of the Anti-conversion bill by AIADMK general secretary, Jayalalithaa and increasing tension between DMK and BJP due to the passage of the bill. The AIADMK win in Sathankulam was significant, since it completes the AIADMK sweep in by-elections after its victory in 2001. Also the anti-conversion bill was not an important factor in the congress-bastion Sathankulam, whose electorate consists of a large percentage of minorities.

Despite attempts by the opposition to delay the Andipatti by-election, due to alleged voter list irregularities, the Election Commission of India decided to have the vacant seat in Andipatti, early in February and push off the other three vacant seats, in May. Andipatti seat was made vacant by the resignation of Thanga Tamil Selvan to facilitate the election of J. Jayalalithaa, who had her corruption charges cleared in late December in 2001. Despite the fact that she could not participate in the 2001 General Elections due to her 4 nominations being disqualified, she was sworn-into office. After being released from the case, she became Chief minister without being a Member of the Legislative Assembly (India). She had to become an MLA within 6 months to stay in office.

As AIADMK had won 132 seats in 2001 State assembly election, even with the breakup of its previous alliance with Tamil Maanila Congress (TMC), Indian National Congress (INC), Communist Party of India (CPI), Communist Party of India (Marxist) (CPM) and Pattali Makkal Katchi (PMK), it would have still continued to stay in power, regardless of the results in the by-election. But since Jayalalithaa was legally not allowed to run for an MLA seat in 2001, she made the decision to run for an MLA seat before swearing in as Chief Minister.

The Andipatti victory, in late February, paved way for Jayalalithaa to swear in as Chief Minister. The party also swept the by-election in late May. The PMK lost an anticipated victory in Acharappakam, a constituency with a high percentage of Vanniyars electorates. It was observed that the Dalit vote base coupled with the popularity of Jayalalithaa led to the defeat, allowing AIADMK to wrest this seat from the PMK.

Alliances
Due to reported frustrations with J. Jayalalithaa, almost all of her allies from 2001 election, left the AIADMK alliance and started their own third front. The Third Front consisted of CPM, CPI, Indian National League (INL), TMC and INC. AIADMK, which was supported by 196 MLAs in 2001, shrunk to 132 seats, with 64 MLAs leaving the alliance. Only 117 seats are required for a party to form a Government. The PMK, who backed AIADMK in 2001, backed the Dravida Munnetra Kazhagam (DMK), in this by-election, which was part of the National Democratic Alliance (NDA).

Results
After Sathankulam  by-election in 2003:

 The number on the left, in the table, represents the total number of MLAs after the by-election, and the number in parenthesis represents, the seats picked up or lost due to the by-election
 The numbers presented for 2001, represents, the alliance, when the PMK and Third Front allied with the AIADMK.

Constituents and results
Source: Election Commission of India

Andipatti

Saidapet
The election here became very controversial, when opposition leaders, DMK, the left and others, complained about ADMK party cadres allegedly working with the police, that resulted in taking over of polling booths. There were also complaints of voter registration fraud by the opposition. The opposition leaders appealed for an entirely new election in this constituent, which was rejected, by the ECI.

Vaniyambadi
Source: The Hindu

 

 

 Indian National League is not a recognized party by ECI, so Nawaz was listed as an Independent, rather than under the INL banner in the election ballots.

Acharapakkam (SC)

Sathankulam
Source: ECI
Election was necessitated due to death of S.S. Mani Nadar.

See also
1.  ECI Press Release

References

State Assembly elections in Tamil Nadu
2000s in Tamil Nadu
By-elections in Tamil Nadu
2002 State Assembly elections in India